Roy De Verne "Rube" Marshall (July 19, 1890 – June 11, 1980) was a Major League Baseball pitcher. He played all or part of four seasons in the majors, from  until , for the Philadelphia Phillies and Buffalo Blues.

Sources

Major League Baseball pitchers
Philadelphia Phillies players
Buffalo Blues players
Wichita Falls Spudders players
Baseball players from Ohio
1890 births
1980 deaths
People from Salineville, Ohio
Portsmouth Cobblers players